Margaret Cecil, Countess of Ranelagh (1672/1673 – 21 February 1728) was an English courtier. The Countess was one of the "Hampton Court Beauties" painted by Sir Godfrey Kneller for Queen Mary II.

Family
Lady Margaret was the daughter of James Cecil, 3rd Earl of Salisbury and his wife Margaret, a daughter of the Earl of Rutland. She first married John Stawell, 2nd Baron Stawell; he died in 1692 without their having any issue, although Crofts Peerage states they had one daughter, Anne. She later married Richard Jones, 1st Earl of Ranelagh on 9 January, either 1695 or 1696; Crofts states they had no issue. Her third husband was George Thomas Downing; the couple had a daughter Sarah Isabell Downing, and a son, George Downing.

References

External links
"Margaret Cecil, Countess of Ranelagh (1672-1728)" Sir Godfrey Kneller, 1690

1670s births
1728 deaths
Irish countesses
Daughters of British earls
Date of birth unknown
Place of birth missing
Place of death missing
Margaret